Dyscherinus is a genus of beetles in the family Carabidae, containing the following species:

 Dyscherinus pauliani Jeannel, 1955
 Dyscherinus pseudomodus (Bänninger, 1933)
 Dyscherinus vadoni Basilewsky, 1973

References

Scaritinae